{{Album ratings
| rev1 = AllMusic
| rev1score = 
| rev2 = Robert Christgau
| rev2score = B−
| rev3 = Rolling Stone
| rev3score = 
| rev4 = Sea of Tranquility| rev4Score = 
}}Toto IV is the fourth studio album by American rock band Toto released in the spring of 1982 by Columbia Records.

The lead single, "Rosanna", peaked at number 2 for five weeks on the Billboard Hot 100 charts, while the album's third single, "Africa", topping the Hot 100 chart, became the group's first and only number 1 hit. Both songs were hits in the UK as well, reaching number 12 and 3, respectively. The fourth single, "I Won't Hold You Back", also peaked within the top ten on the Hot 100, at number 10, but atop the Billboard Adult Contemporary charts for three weeks. It also went into the top 40 in the UK. With the success of "Africa", the album climbed back into the top 10 in early 1983 on both sides of the Atlantic.Toto IV received three Grammy Awards in 1983 including Album of the Year, Producer of the Year for the band, and Record of the Year for "Rosanna". It reached number four on the Billboard 200 album charts in the United States, shortly after its release. It also reached the top ten in other countries, including Canada, Australia, New Zealand, the Netherlands, Italy, Norway, the United Kingdom, and Japan. It was also the last Toto album to feature their original bassist David Hungate until his return in 2014 (with the release of their 2015 album Toto XIV) when he was replaced by Mike Porcaro after the band’s recording of the album, and also the final album to feature original lead vocalist Bobby Kimball until his comeback in 1998 (with the release of the 1999 album Mindfields).

Background
After the success of their self-titled debut, Toto struggled to sustain success on their next two albums, Hydra and Turn Back. The band was under heavy pressure from Columbia Records to deliver a hit album with their next release or be at risk of being dropped from the label.

The band went back to the formula that helped them succeed on their first album, having an album that touched on many different genres of music. They also utilized many outside musicians to help give the sound a more polished, fuller feel than they had on past albums.

This was the final album with the original Toto lineup. David Hungate, who moved to Nashville during the recording of the album, left the band to spend more time with his family. Two years later, prior to beginning recording of their follow-up album, Bobby Kimball was fired by the band due to drug issues that were damaging his voice.

The band delayed touring after the release of the album to instead help in the production of Michael Jackson's Thriller album, as well as collaborating on Chicago's comeback album Chicago 16'' that same year.

Production
The recording took many months during 1981 and 1982 and the band was allowed a much larger than average recording budget. At a time when most bands were using a single 24-track recorder Toto used as many as 3 separate 24-track recorders at the same time.

The 24-track recorders were linked with a computerized SMPTE timecode system. One track of each machine contained the time code synchronization signal while the remaining 23 tracks of each machine were available to record sound. It should also be noted though that a significant number of these tracks were copied and mixed down from musical parts already recorded on another synchronized reel of tape. This was done to reduce the amount of wear on the first generation tapes. It also helped to maintain high quality sound during the extensive overdubbing and mixing process.

Cover art
Philip Garris's original emblem from the Toto album was updated to show four rings since this was their fourth album. The newer looking, well-polished ring around the hilt of the sword represented their latest work. Each successive ring showed a little more wear and a few more chips which represented the band's previous records.

Track listing

Personnel 
Adapted from album's liner notes.

Toto
 Bobby Kimball – lead vocals , backing vocals 
 Steve Lukather – guitars, lead vocals , backing vocals , acoustic piano 
 David Paich – keyboards, backing vocals , horn arrangements , orchestral arrangements , lead vocals 
 Steve Porcaro – keyboards, lead vocals 
 David Hungate – bass guitar
 Jeff Porcaro – drums, percussion

Additional personnel
 Roger Linn – synthesizer programming 
 Ralph Dyck – synthesizers 
 Lenny Castro – congas and percussion 
 Joe Porcaro – percussion , xylophone , timpani , marimba 
 Jim Horn – saxophone , recorders 
 Tom Scott – saxophone 
 Jon Smith – saxophone 
 Jimmy Pankow – trombone 
 Gary Grant – trumpet 
 Jerry Hey – trumpet and horn arrangements 
 James Newton Howard – orchestral arrangements and conductor 
 Marty Paich – orchestral arrangements 
 The Martyn Ford Orchestra – strings 
 Mike Porcaro – cello 
 Tom Kelly – backing vocals 
 Timothy B. Schmit – backing vocals

Production 
 Produced by Toto
 Engineers – Dick Gall, Bruce Heigh, Tom Knox, Greg Ladanyi, David Paich, Steve Porcaro and Al Schmitt.
 Tracks recorded by Al Schmitt , Tom Knox  and Greg Ladanyi .
 Strings recorded by John Kurlander 
 Additional recording by Niko Bolas, Terry Christian, Jamie Ledner, Lon LeMaster, David Leonard and Peggy McCreary.
 Mixed by Greg Ladanyi and Elliot Scheiner
 Mastered by George Marino at Sterling Sound (New York City, New York).
 Photography – Glen Christiensen, Sam Emerson and Jim Hagopian.
 Illustration – Joe Spencer
 Album package concept – Steve Porcaro

Charts

Weekly charts

Year-end charts

Certifications and sales

References

Toto (band) albums
1982 albums
Grammy Award for Album of the Year
Albums arranged by Marty Paich
Columbia Records albums
Albums recorded at Sunset Sound Recorders
Albums recorded at United Western Recorders
Albums recorded in a home studio
Grammy Award for Best Engineered Album, Non-Classical